Heino Jürisalu (13 August 1930 Tartu – 18 April 1991 Tallinn) was an Estonian composer.

In 1954, he graduated from Tallinn State Conservatory in composition speciality.

1970–1988 he was the leader of music ensemble Consortium.

1969–1991, he taught the composition at Tallinn State Conservatory (since 1985 Associate Professor).

Since 1956, he was a member of Estonian Composers' Union.

Works

 "Sümfoniett" (1959)
 "Sinfonie Nr. 1, Pastoraalid" (1970)
 "Sinfonie Nr. 2" (1975)
 "opera "Püha Susanna" (1983)

References

1930 births
1991 deaths
Estonian composers